Edcel Greco Alexandre Burce Lagman, Jr. (born on July 24, 1972), also known as Grex, is a Filipino lawyer and politician from the province of Albay. 

On December 1, 2022, he became Governor of Albay following the Commission on Elections (COMELEC) disqualification of former Governor Noel Rosal. Lagman was previously elected as Vice-Governor of the province of Albay from 2019 until November 30, 2022. He was also elected in the House of Representatives of the Philippines as Congressman of the first district of Albay from 2013 to 2016 and in the Quezon City Council from the 4th district from 2004 to 2012.

As member of the House of Representatives, Lagman principally authored Republic Act No. 10868, or the Centenarians Act of 2016. Lagman also supported several legislations such as R.A. No. 10643, or the Graphic Health Warnings Law, and R.A. No. 10645, or the Mandatory PhilHealth Coverage for Senior Citizens.

Personal life 
Lagman is the son of Filipino human rights lawyer and politician Edcel Lagman. He has six siblings including incumbent Tabaco Mayor and former Congresswoman Cielo Krisel Lagman-Luistro.

Lagman has four sons and two daughters.

Education 
Lagman graduated from the University of the Philippines Diliman with a degree in Behavioral Studies and Political Science. He finished his Bachelor of Laws from Arellano University School of Law and passed the 2000 Philippine Bar Examinations. Lagman also took up Master in Public Administration at the UP National College of Public Administration and Governance.

Legal career 
Lagman became an Assistant Press Officer at the Embassy of the Philippines, Washington, D.C. from 1993 to 1994. He served as a Court Attorney IV at the Supreme Court of the Philippines from October 2022 to November 2022 and eventually became a Partner Associate at Lagman Lagman and Mones Law Firm in 2003.

Political career 
Lagman served as City Councilor of Quezon City from the 4th district from 2004 to 2012. In 2013, he was elected as Albay first district representative. Lagman ran for Vice-Governor in 2019 and won. He was re-elected as Albay Vice-Governor in the May 10, 2022 polls. On December 1, 2022, he was sworn in as governor of the province of Albay after the former governor, Noel Rosal, was disqualified by COMELEC for violating the election law imposing a 45-day campaign spending ban.

See also 

 Governor of Albay
 House of Representatives

References 

Governors of Albay
Filipino lawyers
21st-century Filipino politicians
Living people
1972 births
Aksyon Demokratiko politicians